Sheila van Damm (17 January 1922 – 23 August 1987) was a British woman competitor in motor rallying in the 1950s, and also the former owner of the Windmill Theatre in London.  She began her competitive driving career in 1950, and won the Coupe des Dames, the highest award for women, in the 1953 Alpine Rally. The following year she won the Women's European Touring Championship and, in 1955, the Coupe des Dames at the Monte Carlo Rally.

Biography

She was born in Paddington, west London, the daughter of Vivian Van Damm and his wife, Natalie Lyons.  Her upbringing in a Jewish family was certainly unconventional but then her father was an automobile enthusiast and had been a mechanic with Clement-Talbot in the early days of motoring. He encouraged her to learn to drive, at well below the legal age, and her first journey with him was to drive from London to Brighton. In the Second World War she had more conventional training as a Women's Auxiliary Air Force (WAAF) driver.

While in the WAAF, she entered her first motor sporting event with her only sister Nona as navigator, as a promotional stunt for the Windmill Theatre, which her father managed. With "Windmill Girl" written on the side of the factory-prepared Sunbeam Talbot they finished 3rd in the ladies' section of the MCC-Daily Express car rally.  This led to an official Rootes team Hillman Minx in the 1951 Monte Carlo rally.

Her first major success was the Ladies' Prize in the 1952 Motor Cycling Club rally driving a Sunbeam Talbot.

In the 1953 Alpine Rally, she and co-driver Anne Hall won not only the Coupe des Dames, but also a coveted Coupes des Alpes. Another Coupe des Dames in the 1954 Tulip rally of Holland included outright victory in a 10-lap race around the Zandvoort circuit. The ladies' prize in the Viking rally in Norway clinched the 1954 Ladies' European championship for van Damm and Hall – a triumph they repeated in 1955 in a (Rootes-prepared) Sunbeam Alpine Mk. III works team car. Registered RHP 702 and presently in Australia, this is the only one of six original works cars residing outside the UK. Other works cars were driven by racing drivers Leslie Johnson, Peter Collins and Stirling Moss.

van Damm, Johnson, and Moss won the Team Prize in the 1954 Monte Carlo Rally driving Sunbeam-Talbot 90 Mk. IIs. van Damm was in Rootes' Team Prize-winning team again in 1955 and 1956.

The 1956 Monte Carlo rally was her last with Rootes.

In 1957, van Damm once more entered the Mille Miglia (its final running), again in a works Sunbeam Rapier, this time partnered by David Humphrey. However, they did not finish, losing control on treacherous tramlines and hitting a shop window.

After retirement from racing, she became president of the Doghouse Club for motor racing wives and ladies, and president of the Sunbeam Talbot Alpine Register.

Sheila had worked with her father at the Windmill Theatre from her teens. He inherited it in 1944, and left it to her on his death in 1960. But the changing nature of Soho in London caused it to close in 1964. In 1965, Sheila van Damm toured the Tivoli Circuit Theatres in Sydney and Melbourne, Australia, with her show, "The Windmill Revue". The show featured a number of former Windmill Theatre artistes. This in turn led her to retire with her sister to their small farm in Pulborough in Sussex. She died in London on 23 August 1987.

See also
List of select Jewish racing drivers

References

 British Movietone, "We Never Closed". Story no. 89002. Released 5-11-1964. Filmed for the last night at the Windmill Theatre. 
 BBC "Panorama", A television programme made for the finial Revudeville show. 1964.
 Van Damm, Sheila. No Excuses  London: Putnam. 1957.
 Van Damm, Sheila. We Never Closed  London: Robert Hale. 1967.
 Dolinger, Jane. "Jane Visits London's Breezy Windmill." Modern Man, Vol. X111 No. 7-150, January, 1964.
 "The Windmill" Fiesta, Vol. 7, No. 4. March, 1973.
 Poole, Maurice. "Tonight and Every Night". Soho Clarion Issue no. 136, Spring 2009.
Windmill Theatre Co., Ltd. Souvenirs and Theatre programmes.
 Atkins, Gerry. "Behind the Scenes at the Windmill Revue in Australia." Old Theatres, No. 7, 2011.
 "The Windmill Revue." Tivoli Circuit Australia Pty., Ltd. theatre programmes.

External links
 Sheila van Damm. The Scotsman (9 August 2006). Retrieved 13 April 2009.

1922 births
1987 deaths
English Jews
English racing drivers
English rally drivers
English female racing drivers
Female rally drivers
People from Paddington
Sportspeople from London
English people of Dutch descent